Kuol Manyang is a South Sudanese politician. He is a member of the SPLM. He became governor of Jonglei state on 15 December 2007, following the first former governor, Philip Thon Leek from Dinka Bor, to curb cattle raiding and abduction of children in the region.

Biography 
Kuol is also from Dinka Bor of South Sudan. He was born in 1945 in Mathiang village, located about 25 kilometers northeast of Bor town, capital of Jonglei state. He comes from Pathuyith clan, a well-known warrior section in Dinka Bor from Agok lineage. He pursued elementary and intermediate education in Malakal before going to Khartoum Vocational Training Centre, where he was awarded a diploma in engineering, earning him employment in Wed Madeni, Gezira state, in central Sudan, as a vocational inspector at the center. He later went to East Germany for studies at one of the technical institutes in Magdeburg for two years, 1978-77, where he earned another diploma in engineering. Juuk was appointed instructor at a vocational training centre in Wau in 1977 following his return from East Germany. He later moved to Juba in 1978 where he worked as deputy manager at the Multipurpose Training Centre (MTC) until December 1983 when he decided to rebel against the Sudanese government and joined the Sudan People’s Liberation Movement (SPLM).

He is one of the tallest members in The SPLA commanders. Mr. Kuol is known in Southern Sudan as anti-corruption and development oriented official. He is one of the architect of fairness throughout the liberation struggle and areas of his direct control. Previous to becoming governor of Jonglei, he was Minister of Roads and Transport in the government of National Unity of Sudan. At a party congress at Bor, Kuol was reappointed chairman of the Sudan People's Liberation Movement in Jonglei state, and Deputy Governor Hussein Maar Nyuot deputy chair. A priority for Kuol has been achieving civil order through disarming the various armed groups in South Sudan; sources credit Kuol with being the primary force for that country's disarmament campaign carried out from June through November 2008.

Kuol Manyang continued to serve as Jonglei governor until he was appointed in 2013 as minister of defense. Besides holding this position, he remains the head of the SPLM branch office in Jonglei and continues to hold membership in the SPLM Political Bureau. He was sanctioned by the United States on December 16, 2019, for allegedly fomenting conflict in South Sudan.

Military career 
Commander Kuol Manyang was one of the high-ranking SPLA commanders. He served as the zonal commander in Bor from 1985 to 1988. Before he joined the SPLA He was a lecturer in Juba. He was educated in Europe. The line of succession was already determined by each individual's seniority in the SPLM/SPLA Political-Military High Command. Below is the list according to their seniority:
Cdr Dr. John Garang,
Cdr Kerubino Kuanyin Bol
Cdr William Nyuon Bany
Cdr Martin Majier Gai Ayuel
Cdr Salva Kiir Mayardit
Cdr Arok Thon Arok
Cdr Nyacigak Nyaculuk
Cdr John Kualang
Cdr Dr Riek Machar Teny
Cdr Dr Lam Akol Ajawin
Cdr Yusif Kuwa Mekki
Cdr James Wani Igga
Cdr Daniel Awet Akot
Cdr Kuol Manyang Juuk
Cdr Lual Diing Wol
Cdr Gelario M

Political career
 Minister of transport, Roads and Physical infrastructure
 Governor of Jonglei State
 Jonglei State SPLM/A Chairmanship
 High Executive Council
 Current minister of defence  and veteran  affair

References 

He was appointed Minister of Defense and veteran affairs in 2013 after the South Sudan president dissolve the entire cabinet.
By Bol Mayot Mathiang Agot

External links
 Sudan Government
 "Jonglei MPs applaud Governor for improving security", Sudan Tribune, published 23 February 2009

Living people
South Sudanese state governors
Sudan People's Liberation Movement politicians
Government ministers of Sudan
People from Jonglei State
People of the South Sudanese Civil War
SPLM/SPLA Political-Military High Command
Year of birth missing (living people)
Dinka people